Surasky is a surname. Notable people with the surname include:

 Aharon Surasky (born 1940), Israeli writer
 Charles Surasky, American numismatist
 Chana Timoner (born Carol Ann Surasky; 1951–1998), American rabbi